Frederick Nolting (August 24, 1911 – December 14, 1989) was a United States diplomat who served as United States Ambassador to South Vietnam from 1961 to 1963.

Early life and education
Frederick Ernest Nolting Jr. was born in Richmond, Virginia to Frederick Ernst Nolting Sr. and his wife, the former Mary Buford. Nolting Jr. graduated from the University of Virginia in 1933, where he was a member of the Virginia Glee Club, with a BA in history. He then received a master's degree from Harvard University in 1941 and his Ph.D. from the University of Virginia. He served in the United States Navy during World War II.

Career

Nolting joined the State Department in 1946, where he acted as special assistant to Secretary of State John Foster Dulles for mutual security affairs. He was appointed as a member of the United States delegation to the North Atlantic Treaty Organization (NATO) in 1955.  

In 1957 he was appointed by President Dwight D. Eisenhower as alternate permanent representative to NATO, and in 1961 he was appointed by President John F. Kennedy as United States Ambassador to South Vietnam.

Following his government service, Nolting went to work for Morgan Guaranty Trust Company, and in 1970 joined the faculty of the University of Virginia and became founding director of the Miller Center of Public Affairs.

In 1988 he published his memoir From Trust to Tragedy: The Political Memoirs of Frederick Nolting, Kennedy's Ambassador to Diem's Vietnam.

Personal life
Nolting married Olivia Lindsay Crumpler in 1940. They had four children – Molly, Jane, Grace and Frances. In 1946, he purchased "Sully", the former estate home of Richard Bland Lee, first Congressman from Northern Virginia, built in 1794. He was the last private owner of that estate.

Death
Nolting died on December 14, 1989, aged 78, in Charlottesville, Virginia. He was buried at St. Paul's Churchyard, Ivy, Albemarle County, Virginia.

References

External links
Interview with Frederick Nolting in 1981 as part of the WGBH series Vietnam: A Television History
Interview with Fredick Nolting  in 1982 by the Lyndon Baines Johnson Library

1911 births
1989 deaths
Ambassadors of the United States to South Vietnam
United States Navy personnel of World War II
Military personnel from Richmond, Virginia
Businesspeople from Richmond, Virginia
Writers from Richmond, Virginia
University of Virginia faculty
University of Virginia alumni
Harvard University alumni
20th-century American businesspeople